The Giro della Liguria was an annual multi-day road cycling race that took place in the region of Liguria, Italy.

The race was founded in 2001 as the Giro Riviera Ligure Ponente, and changed names in 2003. In 2005, it was supposed to be a 2.1 event in the inaugural edition of the UCI Europe Tour, however, the race was cancelled.

Winners

References

Men's road bicycle races
Recurring sporting events established in 2001
2001 establishments in Italy
Defunct cycling races in Italy
Sport in Liguria
Cycle races in Italy
2004 disestablishments in Italy
Recurring sporting events disestablished in 2004